David John Grant (born 18 December 1947) is an English former professional footballer who played as a left-half. A product of the Everton youth set up, he made appearances in the English Football League with Welsh club Wrexham. He also played for Bangor City.

References

1947 births
Living people
Footballers from Liverpool
English footballers
Association football wing halves
Everton F.C. players
Wrexham A.F.C. players
Bangor City F.C. players
English Football League players